John Browne, 1st Baron Kilmaine (20 May 1726 – 7 June 1794), known as Sir John Browne, 7th Baronet, from 1765 to 1789, was an Irish politician.

Kilmaine was the younger son of Sir John Browne of The Neale, 5th Baronet, and Margaret Dodwell. His father was the de jure 5th Baronet, of The Neale, but like his predecessors had never assumed the title. His elder brother Sir George Browne, 6th Baronet, was the first to assume the title and in 1765 Kilmaine succeeded him as seventh Baronet. In 1776 he was elected to the Irish House of Commons for Newtownards, a seat he held until 1783, and then represented Carlow Borough as a Member of Parliament (MP) between 1783 and 1789. In 1784, he purchased Gaulstown House from George Rochfort, 2nd Earl of Belvedere  In 1789 he was raised to the Peerage of Ireland as Baron Kilmaine, of The Neale in the County of Mayo. Apart from his parliamentary career he also served as High Sheriff of Mayo in 1778 and 1788.

Lord Kilmaine married the Honourable Alice Caulfeild, daughter of James Caulfeild, 3rd Viscount Charlemont, in 1764. He died in June 1794, aged 68, and was succeeded in his titles by his eldest son James. Lady Kilmaine died in 1797.

Notes

References
Kidd, Charles, Williamson, David (editors). Debrett's Peerage and Baronetage (1990 edition). New York: St Martin's Press, 1990, 

1726 births
1794 deaths
Politicians from County Mayo
Barons in the Peerage of Ireland
Peers of Ireland created by George III
Irish MPs 1776–1783
Irish MPs 1783–1790
High Sheriffs of Mayo
John
Members of the Parliament of Ireland (pre-1801) for County Down constituencies
Members of the Parliament of Ireland (pre-1801) for County Carlow constituencies